Rice Lake Area School District is a school district headquartered in Rice Lake, Wisconsin.

Schools
Secondary:
 Rice Lake High School
 Rice Lake Middle School

Primary:
 Haugen Elementary School
 Hilltop Elementary School
 Tainter Elementary School

References

External links
 Rice Lake Area School District
School districts in Wisconsin
Education in Barron County, Wisconsin